Christine Cornelie Thoma (Christel) Adelaar  (14 February 1935 – 10 January 2013) was a Dutch actress. She was most notable for playing Mammaloe in the Dutch TV series Pipo de Clown.

Life
Adelaar was born in Semarang, Dutch East Indies (now Indonesia). In 1987, she was diagnosed with  breast cancer, but overcame the disease. Then in 2011, she was diagnosed with  lung cancer. She died in Heemstede at the age of 77 as a consequence of this disease.

References

External links

1935 births
2013 deaths
20th-century Dutch actresses
Dutch radio actresses
Dutch women singers
Dutch television actresses
People from Semarang
Deaths from lung cancer in the Netherlands